Viktoria Yevgenyevna Volchkova (married name: Butsaeva; born 30 July 1982) is a Russian figure skating coach and former competitor. She is a four-time (1999–2002) European bronze medalist, the 2002 Grand Prix Final bronze medalist, the 2002 Cup of Russia champion, and a seven-time Russian national medalist. She is also the 1998 JGP Final champion and a two-time (1998–99) World Junior bronze medalist.

Personal life 
Volchkova was born in Leningrad (now Saint Petersburg) to an engineer mother. She studied at the Institute for Physical Culture in Moscow.

Volchkova is also known as Butsaeva. She and her husband, Yuri Butsayev, have a son who was born in March 2012.

Career 
Volchkova began skating at age six in Leningrad after her parents heard a radio announcement about skating lessons. She was interested in pair skating but was too tall. After a few years, she moved to train in Moscow under coach Viktor Kudriavtsev.

Volchkova won bronze, her first major medal, at the 1999 European Championships. She repeated as bronze medalist at the 2000 European Championships, competing with muscle inflammation on the outside of her right ankle. Volchkova won bronze twice more at the event, to make it four consecutive European bronze medals from 1999 to 2002. She represented Russia at the 2002 Winter Olympics and placed 9th.

In spring 2002, Volchkova switched coaches from Kudriavtsev in Moscow to Oleg Vasiliev in Chicago. After a bronze medal at the 2002 Skate Canada International, she won gold at the 2002 Cup of Russia and qualified for the Grand Prix Final, where she was awarded bronze. In December, Volchkova withdrew from the 2003 Russian Championships and missed three weeks of training as a result of pneumonia. In January, she placed eighth at the 2003 European Championships but achieved the best World result of her career, fifth, in March at the 2003 World Championships in Washington, D.C.

Marina Kudriavtseva became her coach in January 2004 at the 2004 Russian Championships. In December 2004, Volchkova broke her wrist in a fall during training and consequently missed the 2005 Russian Championships. In September 2005, she underwent meniscus surgery and returned to competition at the 2006 Russian Championships.

Volchkova withdrew from the 2006 Winter Olympics after being hospitalized with a right arm infection. She last competed at the 2007 Russian Championships in January 2007. Volchkova trained at the Moskvich rink in south-east Moscow and, after retiring from competition, remained at the rink as a coach. Butsaeva's students include: 
 Sofia Biryukova 
 Polina Korobeynikova (since mid-2007) 
 Murad Kurbanov
 Vladimir Samoilov
 Ilya Yablokov
 Alexey Erokhov (since July 2020)

Programs

Results 
GP: Grand Prix; JGP: Junior Grand Prix

References

External links 

 
 

1982 births
Living people
Russian female single skaters
Russian figure skating coaches
Figure skaters at the 2002 Winter Olympics
Olympic figure skaters of Russia
Figure skaters from Saint Petersburg
European Figure Skating Championships medalists
World Junior Figure Skating Championships medalists
Female sports coaches
Goodwill Games medalists in figure skating
Competitors at the 1998 Goodwill Games
Competitors at the 2001 Goodwill Games